Linda J. Saif is an American microbial scientist who works at Ohio State University. In 2015, she became the first female recipient of the Wolf Prize in Agriculture for her research in virology and immunology.

Saif is a Fulbright scholar and a member of the National Academy of Sciences. In 2017 Saif was inducted into the National Academy of Inventors (NAI). 
In 2003, she studied the SARS coronavirus outbreak with the World Health Organization.

Saif is married to immunologist Dr. Mo Saif, Professor Emeritus, Department of Veterinary Preventive Medicine and Emeritus Program Head of the Food Animal Health Research Program, Ohio Agricultural Research and Development Center, The Ohio State University.

Early life and education 
Saif grew up in Ohio and was exposed to agriculture from an early age from time spent at her grandparents' farm. Saif attended private liberal arts college the College of Wooster in 1965 and graduated with a Honors in Biology in 1969. She briefly attended Case Western Reserve University, before attending Ohio State University in 1970 to complete a Master of Science in Microbiology and Immunology. She then undertook a PhD at Ohio State University and completed in 1976.

References 

21st-century American biologists
Living people
American women biologists
Members of the United States National Academy of Sciences
Wolf Prize in Agriculture laureates
Ohio State University alumni
College of Wooster alumni
Ohio State University faculty
20th-century American scientists
20th-century American women scientists
21st-century American women scientists
Fellows of the American Association for the Advancement of Science
Year of birth missing (living people)
American women academics